The 1946 United States Senate election in Maine was held on September 9, 1946. 

Incumbent Republican Senator Owen Brewster was re-elected to a second term in office over Democrat Peter McDonald.

Republican primary

Candidates
 Owen Brewster, incumbent Senator since 1941

Results
Senator Brewster was unopposed for re-nomination.

Democratic primary

Candidates
 Peter McDonald, unsuccessful candidate for U.S. Representative in 1940

Results
McDonald was unopposed for the Democratic nomination.

General election

Results

See also 
 1946 United States Senate elections

References 

1946
Maine
United States Senate